Gerald Gentleman Station (GGS) is Nebraska's largest electricity generating plant. The plant, owned and operated by Nebraska Public Power District (NPPD), consists of two coal-fired generating units (launched into service in 1979 and 1982), which together have the capability to generate 1,365 megawatts of power.

History
The construction of Gerald Gentleman station began in May 1973 and the first unit entered commercial service in April 1979 at a cost of $335 million. The construction of the second unit began in June 1977 and it began its commercial service in January 1982 with an additional expenditure of $287 million. The facility is named after Gerald Gentleman, a Platte Center, Nebraska native.

Coal supply
Coal comes from Wyoming's Powder River Basin by railroad, using Union Pacific and BNSF Railway lines as well as tracks that were built for this purpose by NPPD.  At full capacity, Gerald Gentleman Station burns as much as 800 tons of coal per hour.

Water use
The waste heat is dumped into man-made Sutherland Reservoir, fed by the Sutherland Canal, which originates at Kingsley Dam on North Platte River.

References

External links

 Nebraska Public Power District - Gerald Gentleman Station

Energy infrastructure completed in 1979
Energy infrastructure completed in 1982
Coal-fired power stations in Nebraska
Buildings and structures in Lincoln County, Nebraska
1979 establishments in Nebraska